I'd Rather Believe in You is the 13th studio album by American singer-actress Cher, released in October 1976 by Warner Bros. Records. This album was a commercial failure and failed to chart.

Album information
Because Stars was such an abysmal financial failure, Cher was put back with narrative pop songs on her next album. The album garnered no attention, and as such did not chart. Producer Michael Omartian attributed this to "a lack of promotion."

Cher recorded this album while she was pregnant with Elijah Blue Allman, her second child. She wrote a dedication to him on the back-sleeve of the album: And a special thanks to Elijah for waiting until the day after I finished my album. Cher.

Only one single was released, "Long Distance Love Affair" (b/w "Borrowed Time"). It was performed twice on her TV show, but charted nowhere. "I'd Rather Believe In You" was planned as the second single from the album, but it was cancelled after the first single failed. A different version of the song, in which the lyrics are directed toward God instead of a lover, was recorded by the contemporary Christian singing group the Imperials for their 1980 album Priority, which was also produced by Omartian.

In 1976, Cher recorded two other songs: "A Love Like Yours (Don't Come Knockin' Everyday)," a duet with Harry Nilsson, and "Pirate" (from her album Cherished which was released a year later), the latter of which starts off the album on some editions.

The album has never been released on CD, and the only CD versions in circulation are bootlegs. According to Billboard, Cher owned this album's master rights and Warner had no right to reissue.

On 30 July 2021, it was announced that a restored & remastered version of the album would be available exclusively on Cher’s official YouTube channel on 6 August 2021.

Track listing

Personnel
Cher - lead vocals
Dean Parks, Lee Ritenour - guitar
Jay Graydon - guitar, mandolin
Ben Benay - guitar, harmonica
David Hungate, Lee Sklar, Scott Edwards - bass guitar
Michael Omartian - keyboards, backing vocals
Jeff Porcaro - drums
Steve Barri, Victor Feldman - percussion
Chuck Findley, Lew McCreary, Nino Tempo, Steve Douglas, Steve Madaio - horns
Dan Walsh, Gene Nelson, Ginger Blake, Jim Haas, Julia Tillman Waters, Kerry Chater, Maxine Tillman Waters, Michael Price, Stephanie Spring - backing vocals
Technical
Steve Barri - record producer
Michael Omartian - record producer
Phil Kaye - sound engineer
Ed Thrasher - art direction
Norman Seeff - photography

References

External links

1976 albums
Cher albums
Albums produced by Michael Omartian
Warner Records albums